The Cestui que Vie Act 1707 (6 Ann c 72) is an Act of the Parliament of Great Britain.

This Act was partly in force in Great Britain at the end of 2010.

References
Halsbury's Statutes,

External links
The Cestui que Vie Act 1707, as amended, from Legislation.gov.uk.

Great Britain Acts of Parliament 1707